Catherine Baker (born 16 July 1947 in Lille) is a French journalist and unschooling essayist. She has also more recently written against the whole prison system, arguing for a complete abolition. Some of her books were later re-edited and their full text made freely available online.

Bibliography
1982 : Balade dans les solitudes ordinaires ("Wandering Through Ordinary Loneliness"), . A book which beside its main subject contains many rich psychological, sociological and metaphysical insights.
1985 : Insoumission à l'école obligatoire ("Refusing Submission to Obligatory School System"), . Explaining the failings of the school system and her choice of unschooling her daughter.
2005 : Pourquoi faudrait-il punir ? ("Why should we punish?"). Advocating complete abolition of the prison system.

External links
 Tahin Party – Her new publisher, including full texts of Insoumission à l'école obligatoire and Pourquoi faudrait-il punir ?.
 Against Prisons – Supporting website of Pourquoi faudrait-il punir ?

French educational theorists
French journalists
Living people
Homeschooling advocates
1947 births
Advocates of unschooling and homeschooling
People from Lille
20th-century French educators